The 1978 Morehead State Eagles football team was an American football team that represented Morehead State University as a member of the Ohio Valley Conference (OVC) during the 1978 NCAA Division I-AA football season. In their third year under head coach Wayne Chapman, the Eagles compiled a 2–6–1 record (1–5 against conference opponents), finished in a three-way tie for five place in the OVC, and were outscored by a total of 206 to 145. The team played its home games at Jayne Stadium in Morehead, Kentucky.

On November 7, 1978, Chapman announced that he was resigning as the school's head football coach, effective at the end of the season. In three years as Morehead's head coach, Chapman compiled a 6–21–3 record. In December 1978, Morehead announced the hiring of Tom Lichtenberg to replace Chapman.

Schedule

References

Morehead State
Morehead State Eagles football seasons
Morehead State Eagles football